St Patrick's Carrickcruppen Gaelic Football Club (GAA) is a Gaelic Athletic Association club within Armagh GAA. It is one of three GAA clubs in the village of Camlough, near Newry, in the south-east of Armagh (the others being Shane O'Neill's and Craobh Rua Camlocha hurling club).

It currently plays Gaelic football in the Armagh Senior Championship, and in the Armagh Senior League.

History
The club was founded in 1944. The founding members were  Oliver Loughran, Colin Crilly, Paddy Carlisle, Bobby Browne and James Galloghly. Magill's field was the club's pitch for many years, before its relocation to the current grounds on Lowes Lane.

To date Carrickcruppen has won four Armagh Senior championships.

In 1979 Carrickcruppen lost the Ulster GAA Senior Club Football Championship to Scotstown of Monaghan.

Honours
 Armagh Senior Football Championship (4)
 1959, 1978, 1979, 1982 
 Armagh Intermediate Football Championship (2)
 2004, 2021
Armagh Under-21 Football Championship: (2) 
 2007, 2008
 Armagh Under-21 Intermediate Football Championship (1)
 2019
Armagh Under 16 Championship (1)
1993
Armagh Minor Div 3 Championship (1)
2017

Notable players
 Billy Joe Padden, former Mayo and Armagh player

 Peter Loughran "Duck" (snr)  his father Oliver was one of the main founders of the club. Armagh Minor in the successful Ulster championship campaign of 1968. He was drafted onto the Armagh senior panel in 1969, while still only 18 and for the next fourteen years established himself on the county as a footballer of rare ability.
His role in the glory years of the county from 1977 to 1982 is well documented when Armagh arrived into the national limelight. 
He holds three Armagh senior championship medals, three Ulster senior medals, an Ulster minor medal and two Railway Cup medals.

Ladies footballers
 Caroline O'Hanlon

Camogie
The camogie team associated with the club has produced players who have represented Armagh and Ulster.

References

External links
 Carrickcruppen page on Armagh GAA website

Gaelic games clubs in County Armagh
Gaelic football clubs in County Armagh
1944 establishments in Northern Ireland